Sebastian Huke (born 11 August 1989 in Leinefelde) is a German footballer who currently plays for Tennis Borussia Berlin.

Huke was a member of the German team at the 2006 UEFA European Under-17 Championship.

References

External links 
 
 Sebastian huke Interview

1989 births
Living people
People from Leinefelde-Worbis
German footballers
Germany youth international footballers
Association football forwards
Footballers from Thuringia
3. Liga players
Hertha BSC II players
Sportfreunde Siegen players
VfL Wolfsburg II players
FC Carl Zeiss Jena players
Tennis Borussia Berlin players
FSV Optik Rathenow players
FC Viktoria 1889 Berlin players
Hertha Zehlendorf players